"Cover the Earth" is a song by American Christian musicians Kari Jobe and Cody Carnes. The song was released on September 14, 2018, as a single. The song was written by Cody Carnes and Daniella Young. Jacob Sooter produced the single.

"Cover the Earth" peaked at No. 29 on the US Hot Christian Songs chart.

Background
Kari Jobe and Cody Carnes released "Cover the Earth" as a single on September 14, 2018. The song was originally written and released by Daniella Mason, with Cody Carnes adding a bridge to the song for their recording. Carnes shared the story behind the song, saying,

Composition

Critical reception
Jonathan Andre of 365 Days of Inspiring Media gave a positive review of the song, saying "As far as the song goes, “Cover the Earth” has some serious Jesus Culture and Bethel Music vibes, as the guitar led inspiring mid-tempo worship anthem features both Kari and Cody ardently asking the Holy Spirit to cover the Earth, essentially praying for revival in our country and in the world." Andre concluded that the song is "simply magical."

Commercial performance
"Cover the Earth" made its debut at number 29 on Billboard's Hot Christian Songs chart dated September 29, 2018. The song spent eight non-consecutive weeks on the chart.

The song debuted at No. 33 on the US Christian Airplay chart dated February 2, 2019. The song peaked at No. 31 and spent five consecutive weeks on the chart.

Music videos
The live music video of "Cover the Earth" performed by Cody Carnes, recorded at Gateway Students Conference, was published on September 13, 2018, on Kari Jobe's YouTube channel. On September 14, 2018, the lyric video of "Cover the Earth" was published on Cody Carnes' YouTube channel. On September 26, 2018, the acoustic performance video of the song was released on Kari Jobe's YouTube channel.

Track listing

Credits
Credits adapted from Tidal.
 Cody Carnes — primary artist , producer 
 Jeremy Edwardson — mixing 
 Kari Jobe — primary artist 
 Drew Lavyne — mastering engineer 
 Sean Moffit — mixing

Charts

Release history

References

External links
 

2018 singles
2018 songs
Contemporary Christian songs
Kari Jobe songs
Cody Carnes songs
Songs written by Cody Carnes